The Emilia Romagna motorcycle Grand Prix was a motorcycling event that was introduced during the 2020 Grand Prix motorcycle racing season and retained for the 2021 season as a response to the COVID-19 pandemic.

Official names and sponsors
2020: Gran Premio Tissot dell'Emilia Romagna e della Riviera di Rimini
2021: Gran Premio Nolan del Made in Italy e dell'Emilia-Romagna

Winners of the Emilia Romagna motorcycle Grand Prix

Multiple winners (manufacturers)

By year
The Grand Prix was held in Misano World Circuit Marco Simoncelli.

References

Motorcycle Grands Prix
Motorcycle racing in Italy
2020 establishments in Italy
Recurring sporting events established in 2020
2021 disestablishments in Italy
Recurring sporting events disestablished in 2021